3,5-Difluoromethcathinone  (also known as 3,5-DFMC) is a chemical compound from the cathinone family that has been sold as a designer drug, first being identified in Australia in 2009.

Legal status 
In the United Kingdom, 3,5-DFMC is a controlled drug under the cathinone blanket ban.

3,5-DFMC is an Anlage II controlled drug in Germany.

See also 
 3-Fluoroamphetamine
 3-Fluoroethamphetamine
 3-Fluoromethamphetamine
 3-Fluoromethcathinone
 Manifaxine
 Substituted cathinone

References 

Cathinones
Designer drugs
Fluoroarenes
Norepinephrine-dopamine releasing agents